Frederick or Fredric Frank may refer to:

Fred Frank (1873–1950), baseball outfielder
Fred H. Frank (1895–1957), politician
Fredric M. Frank (1911–1977), film screenwriter
Frederick Charles Frank (1911–1998), physicist
Frederick Frank (businessman) (born 1932), investment banker
Frederick S. Frank (1935–2008), literary scholar

See also
Frederick M. Franks Jr. (born 1936), United States Army general